The 1876 United States presidential election in Colorado took place on November 7, 1876, as part of the 1876 United States presidential election. The state legislature chose three representatives, or electors to the Electoral College, who voted for president and vice president, which would be the first and only time the state would do so.

Colorado voted in its first ever presidential election, having become the 38th state on August 1 of that year. The state cast three electoral votes for the Republican candidate Rutherford B. Hayes. These electors were chosen by the Colorado General Assembly, the state legislature, rather than by popular vote, the last time in American history that a state's electors were chosen without a popular vote and the only one after the American Civil War. This proved to be decisive as Hayes would win the electoral vote by a margin of one vote. Had Colorado not been a state in time for the 1876 election, Hayes would have lost the 1876 election to Democratic candidate Samuel J. Tilden.

Results

References

Colorado
1876
1876 Colorado elections